Platysphyrus tibialis is a species of beetle in the family Carabidae, the only species in the genus Platysphyrus.

References

Scaritinae